Chokwe (also known as Batshokwe, Ciokwe, Kioko, Kiokwe, Quioca, Quioco, Shioko, Tschiokloe or Tshokwe) is a Bantu language spoken by the Chokwe people of the Democratic Republic of the Congo, Angola and Zambia. It is recognised as a national language of Angola, where half a million people were estimated to have spoken it in 1991; another half a million speakers lived in the Congo in 1990, and some 20,000 in Zambia in 2010. It is used as a lingua franca in eastern Angola.

Writing system 

Angola's Instituto de Línguas Nacionais (National Languages Institute) has established spelling rules for Chokwe with a view to facilitate and promote its use.

Phonology

Vowels 

Vowels may also be heard as nasalized when preceding nasal consonants.

Consonants 

Affricate sounds /t͡ʃ, d͡ʒ, ⁿd͡ʒ/ may also be pronounced as palatal stops [c, ɟ, ᶮɟ].

Tones 
Chokwe has three tones as /v́/, /v̀/, and /v̂/.

Examples

References

External links

Learn Chokwe on the internet (Mofeko) Omotola Akindipe, Geofrey Kakaula & Alcino Joné

Chokwe-Luchazi languages
Languages of Angola
Languages of the Democratic Republic of the Congo
Languages of Zambia
Chokwe